The Opposition in the Australian state of Queensland comprises the largest party or coalition of parties not in Government. The Opposition's purpose is to hold the Government to account and constitute a "Government-in-waiting" should the existing Government fall. To that end, a Leader of the Opposition and Shadow Ministers for the various government departments question the Premier and Ministers on Government policy and administration, and formulate the policy the Opposition would pursue in Government. It is sometimes styled "His Majesty's Loyal Opposition" to demonstrate that although it opposes the Government, it remains loyal to the King.

At times, the Opposition consisted of more than one party, notably when the Coalition parties (the state Nationals and Liberals) were in Opposition. Those state parties entered Opposition in 1996 and merged to form the Liberal National Party of Queensland (LNP) in 2008, National Leader Lawrence Springborg becoming Leader of the LNP and remaining Leader of the Opposition.

The current Leader of the Opposition is LNP Leader David Crisafulli, and Jarrod Bleijie is the Deputy Leader. David Janetzki was the Deputy Leader of the Opposition between November 2020 and March 2022.

Current arrangement
Following the resignation of Janetzki as deputy party leader and the election of Jarrod Bleijie as the new leader, a reshuffle of the shadow ministry was undertaken on 15 March 2022.

Six members of the Crisafulli Shadow Ministry are women, comprising 22% of the shadow ministry. The longest-serving Shadow Minister is Fiona Simpson MP, the Mother of the House, who has been a Member of Parliament since 1992. The shortest-serving Shadow Minister is Amanda Camm MP, who was elected as the Member for Whitsunday at the 2020 State Election.

First arrangement

The first shadow ministry was announced on 12 November 2020, with effect from 16 November. It is led by Opposition Leader David Crisafulli

See also
 Opposition (Australia)
Deputy Leader of the Opposition

References

External links
 Office of the Queensland Opposition

Politics of Queensland
Queensland shadow ministries